Per Owe Adamson (born 8 March 1935) is a former Swedish cyclist. He competed in the individual road race and team time trial events at the 1960 Summer Olympics.

References

External links
 

1935 births
Living people
Swedish male cyclists
Olympic cyclists of Sweden
Cyclists at the 1960 Summer Olympics
Sportspeople from Västra Götaland County